Blomeyer is an unincorporated community in Cape Girardeau County, in the U.S. state of Missouri.

History
A post office called Blomeyer was established in 1900, and remained in operation until 1909. The community was named after E. H. Blomeyer, a pioneer citizen.

References

Unincorporated communities in Cape Girardeau County, Missouri
Unincorporated communities in Missouri